Coccosteidae is a family of arthrodire placoderms from the Early to Late Devonian.  Fossils appear in various strata in Europe, North America and China.

Phylogeny
Coccosteidae belongs to the larger clade Coccosteomorphi, which together with its sister clade Pachyosteomorphi forms the group Eubrachythoraci. The phylogeny of Coccosteidae can be shown in the cladogram below:

Genera

Belgiosteus
A genus of very large coccosteids. Species are found in Middle Devonian Belgium and China.

Clarkosteus

Coccosteus
The type genus of the family. Numerous species are found in Middle to Upper Devonian strata throughout Europe and parts of North America.

Dickosteus

Jiuchengia
The earliest known coccosteid from Late Emsian Yunnan province, China. It is distinguished from other coccosteids by having an elongated occipital.

Livosteus
A genus of very large coccosteids known from Middle to Late Devonian strata of Eastern Europe.

Millerosteus
A genus of very small coccosteids known from Middle to Late Devonian strata throughout Europe. Some species are found in the same strata with certain species of Coccosteus.

Protitanichthys

Watsonosteus

Woodwardosteus

References